The common thresher (Alopias vulpinus) can harbor a number of internal and external parasites:

References

Parasites of fish
Alopiidae